Giovanni Battista Bellé (4 October 1776 - 30 June 1844) was an Italian priest who became Bishop of Mantua, based in the city of Mantua, Italy.

Giovanni Battista Bellé was born in Lodi, Lombardy, on 4 October 1776.
He was ordained a priest on 28 February 1801.
At the time of his appointment he was dean of the parish of Lodi Cathedral.
He was selected Bishop of Mantova on 20 February 1835.
He was confirmed bishop on 24 July 1835, and ordained two days later.

Bellé undertook a detailed pastoral visit of his diocese.
He paid particular attention to the seminary, and restored its original buildings for use as a minor seminary.
He died on 30 June 1844.

References
Citations

Sources

1776 births
1844 deaths
Bishops of Mantua
People from Lodi, Lombardy